Librilla is a Spanish village in the Murcia region. It had a population of 4614 in 2010 and an area of 56 km2. It's placed in both sides of the Orón river.

Geography

Librilla is located next to the Algecira's stream and it's crossed by the Oron river. It's situated in the shadow of Sierra de Carrascoy and the slopes of El Castellar, bordering the municipalities of Murcia to the north and east, north by Mula and Alhama de Murcia to the south and west.

History

Librilla's history dates back from Iberians time, which left the remains of a settlement in El Castellar.
The name of this town gave it the Arab geographer Al-Idrissi, in the 12th century, called "Lymbraya", which in Arabic means "Ghost's stream" (Barranco de los Espectros).
In 1243, after Muslim rule Librilla along with the rest of the Kingdom of Murcia is delivered as a protectorate of the future Alfonso X of Castile, then infant, through the surrender of Alcaraz. In times of Alfonso XI, Juan Manuel, governor of the King of Castile in the Kingdom of Murcia, Librilla inherited as part of the estates belonging to his father.

Demographics

Main sights

The most notable places in Librilla include:
 San Bartolome's Church;
 The Town Hall;
 Castle's ruins;
 Sagrado Corazon's Park, always know how "El Monumento";
 "Escalera de los Moros";
 "Caseron Marques de Camachos";
 "Las Posadas";
 Rosalía's Manor (Casa Méndez);
 Centenary elm in El Lavdor;

Economy 
The main economic activity is agriculture Librilla with irrigated orchards, especially the production of lemons. Librilla industrial production is very recent, from the construction of industrial estate "Cabecicos Blancos", situated along the Mediterranean motorway, 20 km from Murcia. The polygon has an area of 750,000 m2 of industrial land and 512,000 m2 of building land and has good access.

Gastronomy 

The main dishes of local cuisine are rice with rabbit, stew, crumbs, michirones (dried beans cooked with ham and sausages), rabbit with garlic and the pot of cooked pork.
One type of traditional bread called pitanza, which weighs 200 grams and is released thousands from the balcony of City Hall every 22 August. This is a unique event both regionally and nationally originated in medieval times.

Holidays 
 May 2–3: "Festividad de la Santa Cruz".
July 16: Carmen's Virgin.
 August 2: Our Lady of Angels.
 August 18–24: "Fiestas patronales en honor a San Bartolomé".
 September 8: Pilgrimage to the shrine of Our Lady of Bethlehem that begins, in alternate years, in Librilla or in Sangonera la Seca.

Celebrities born in Librilla 
 Antonio Soto Alcón (1952-), painter, he received the «European painter 2005» award from European Parliament.

Sister cities
 Saint-Jean-de-Védas (France)

References

Municipalities in the Region of Murcia